This list is of the Historic Sites of Japan located within the Prefecture of Gunma.

National Historic Sites
As of 1 August 2020, fifty-two Sites have been designated as being of national significance (including three *Special Historic Sites).

|}

Prefectural Historic Sites
As of 10 March 2020, eighty-eight Sites have been designated as being of prefectural importance.

Municipal Historic Sites
As of 1 May 2019, a further four hundred and thirty-one Sites have been designated as being of municipal importance.

See also

 Cultural Properties of Japan
 Kōzuke Province
 List of Places of Scenic Beauty of Japan (Gunma)
 List of Cultural Properties of Japan - historical materials (Gunma)
 List of Cultural Properties of Japan - paintings (Gunma)
 Gunma Prefectural Museum of History

References

External links
  Cultural Properties of Gunma Prefecture

Gunma Prefecture
 Gunma